No Going Back may refer to:

No Going Back (TV series), a British reality TV series
No Going Back (Johnny Coppin album), 1979
No Going Back (Stiff Little Fingers album), 2014
No Going Back (novel), a 1960 children's novel by Monica Edwards
No Going Back (detective novel), a 2020 detective novel by Sheena Kamal
Hollyoaks: No Going Back, a late night spin-off from the British television soap opera Hollyoaks